The Mangler Reborn is a 2005 American horror film and the third entry in the Mangler film series based on a 1972 short story by Stephen King. The film was released straight to DVD on November 29, 2005 by Lions Gate Entertainment and Baseline StudioSystems. Directors Gardner and Cunningham intended the film to be a "rebirth" of the film franchise, with the film not requiring viewers to have seen the prior two films. It is an alternate sequel to the first film.

Synopsis
The movie takes place after the events in the first film and follows Hadley (Weston Blakesley), a repairman that purchases the possessed machine from the first film and becomes obsessed with it. Hadley awakens the machine with his blood and after being "eaten" by it, is forced to feed it new blood to stop his corpse from rotting. One day, a young woman named Jamie comes home, having been fired from her job as an executive after getting into a fight with her boss.
 
Her boyfriend, Sean, having heard about her workplace incident, breaks up with her and moves out of the house. While showering, Jamie starts to cry, until her shower is unexpectedly shut off, making call for Hadley to repair her water heater. With her back turned, Hadley knocks her unconscious and takes her back to his home, which now fortified with a security system and deadly booby traps. Rick and Mike, a father/son burglary duo, try to break into Hadley's home, after hearing about his life insurance policy that he has.

Rick breaks in and communicates with Mike on a radio that he can't get out. After hearing another victim named Gwen Wallach's cries for help, he tries to help her, but Hadley comes home and beats Rick to death with a ballpean hammer, and feeds him to his machine. Mike walks into the house while Hadley is away, and wants to help Jamie get out of the house, but just wants the money and leave.
 
Mike thinks that his dad left him, while conversing with Jamie about his life after his mother died, leaving his father widowed, not knowing about past criminal history. Hadley, now knowing Mike is inside the house tries to kill him, but accidentally disables his security system, unlocking the room Jamie was in, freeing her, while Mike starts to fight Hadley, whom kills him by shoving him head first into a woodchipper. Jamie and Hadley fight, resulting in both of them falling into the woodchipper. A week later, Hadley, having survived, rings the doorbell of another potential victim.

Cast
 Aimee Brooks as Jamie
 Reggie Bannister as Rick
 Weston Blakesley as Hadley
 Scott Speiser as Mike
 Juliana Dever as Louise Watson
 Sarah Lilly as Beatrice Watson
 Renee Dorian as Gwen
 Rhett Giles as Sean
 Jeff Burr as Lawnmowing Man

Reception
Critical reception for The Mangler Reborn was largely negative. DVD Talk panned the film, criticizing it as "a formless, meandering, and stunningly boring little turkey". Reel Film also gave a negative review, writing that while "the film comes off as a masterpiece when compared with its predecessors, The Mangler Reborn ultimately just doesn't work".

References

External links 
 
  
 

2005 films
American supernatural horror films
Alternative sequel films
Lionsgate films
Direct-to-video sequel films
Direct-to-video horror films
2000s English-language films
2000s American films